Chinavulempadu is a village in Y. Ramavaram Mandal, East Godavari district in the state of Andhra Pradesh in India.

Demographics 
 India census, This Village had a population of 228, out of which 115 were male and 113 were female. Population of children below 6 years of age were 16%. The literacy rate of the village is 34%.

References 

Villages in Y. Ramavaram mandal